NGC 484 is an elliptical galaxy in the constellation Tucana. It is located approximately 218 million light-years from Earth and was discovered on October 28, 1834 by astronomer John Herschel.

See also 
 List of galaxies 
 List of NGC objects (1–1000)

References

External links 
 
 SEDS

Elliptical galaxies
0484
4764
Astronomical objects discovered in 1834
Tucana (constellation)